Debbye Turner Bell (born September 19, 1965 in Honolulu, Hawaii) is an American TV anchor, veterinarian, talk show host, former beauty queen and winner of the 1990 Miss America pageant.

Early life and education
Turner was born in Honolulu, Hawaii and raised in Jonesboro, Arkansas. Turner earned a Bachelor of Science in agriculture from Arkansas State University, and attended the University of Missouri. She is a member of Alpha Kappa Alpha sorority. Turner also spent a couple of years honing her public service skills working for Safeway Stores.

In 1991, she received her Doctor of Veterinary Medicine degree from the University of Missouri College of Veterinary Medicine. She became a spokesperson for Purina and pursued a career in veterinary medicine before going into television.

Pageantry
Turner was the first runner-up at the Miss Arkansas Pageant, a state preliminary competition for the Miss America program in 1988.

In the summer of 1989, she won the Miss Missouri title and went on to win the 1990 Miss America crown. Turner is a singer, pianist, and skilled percussionist, evidenced by her marimba rendition of '"Flight of the Bumblebee"' in the talent portion of the 1990 Miss America contest. Turner was the third African-American national titleholder and the first—and as of 2019, the only—Miss Missouri to be crowned Miss America.

Career
Turner's first hosting job came at the St. Louis NBC affiliate KSDK, on a show called Show Me St. Louis in 1995.

Six years later, Turner joined CBS News as a feature correspondent then became their "resident veterinarian" and a fill-in anchor. Turner was also a fill-in anchor on the CBS Morning News.  Turner left CBS in 2012. She has appeared on Animal Planet's Cats 101 and Dogs 101 series. She was the host of Arise America, on Arise News. She is currently the Leadership and discipleship leader at Kentwood Community Church, located in Grand Rapids Michigan.

Personal life
Turner is the daughter of Frederick C. Turner, Jr. and Gussie Turner. Turner married Gerald Bell in 2008. The couple have a daughter.

Turner's older sister, Suzette, is married to megachurch pastor, Kirbyjon Caldwell.

References

External links
Turner's official website
Debbye's Arise News Twitter
Turner biography at The Encyclopedia of Arkansas History and Culture

1965 births
Living people
People from Honolulu
American television news anchors
Miss America 1990 delegates
Miss America winners
Arkansas State University alumni
People from St. Louis
People from Missouri
People from Jonesboro, Arkansas
University of Missouri alumni
American veterinarians
Miss America Preliminary Swimsuit winners
Women veterinarians
American women television journalists
African-American beauty pageant winners
20th-century American people
20th-century African-American women
20th-century African-American people
21st-century American women